22-Mussoorie Legislative Assembly constituency is one of the seventy electoral Uttarakhand Legislative Assembly constituencies of Uttarakhand state in India representing Mussoorie.

Mussoorie Legislative Assembly constituency is a part of Tehri Garhwal (Lok Sabha constituency).

Members of Legislative Assembly

Election results

2022

2017 results

References

External link
  
http://eci.nic.in/eci_main/CurrentElections/CONSOLIDATED_ORDER%20_ECI%20.pdf. The Election Commission of India. p. 509.
http://election.uk.gov.in/Vidhan_sabha2012/form20_2012_PDF/21-Dehradun%20Cantonment.pdf
http://ceo.uk.gov.in/files/Election2012/RESULTS_2012_Uttarakhand_State.pdf
https://web.archive.org/web/20090619064401/http://gov.ua.nic.in/ceouttranchal/ceo/ac_pc.aspx
https://web.archive.org/web/20101201021552/http://gov.ua.nic.in/ceouttranchal/ceo/ac_detl.aspx

Dehradun district
Assembly constituencies of Uttarakhand
Mussoorie